Gilles Tremblay may refer to:

 Gilles Tremblay (composer) (1932–2017), Canadian composer
 Gilles Tremblay (ice hockey) (1938–2014), retired Canadian ice hockey left winger